Zharnel Hughes (born 13 July 1995) is an Anguillan-born British sprinter who specialises in the 100 metres and 200 metres. Born and raised in the British Overseas Territory of Anguilla, he has competed internationally for Great Britain in the Olympic Games, World Athletics and European Athletics events, and for England at the Commonwealth Games, since 2015.

Hughes had significant success in his youth representing Anguilla, winning sprint gold medals at the CARIFTA Games, Central American and Caribbean Junior Championships in Athletics and the Pan American Junior Athletics Championships.He holds the Anguillian national records in both 100 m and 200 m

Following his transfer of allegiance Hughes placed fifth in the 200 m final at the 2015 World Championships in Athletics. Injury affected his 2016 and 2017 seasons and he was eliminated in the rounds-stage at the 2016 European Athletics Championships and 2017 World Championships in Athletics. He returned to fitness in 2018 and won the 4 × 100 metres relay title at the 2018 Commonwealth Games with England. Hughes crossed the line first in the final of the 200 metres at the Games, but was disqualified for impeding an athlete in the neighbouring lane.

He won the gold medal in both the 100 metres and 4 x 100 metres relay at the 2018 European Championships, and in both the 200 metres and 4 x 100 metres relay at the 2022 European Championships representing Great Britain, and once more won gold in the 4 x 100 metres relay at the 2022 Commonwealth Games, again representing England. In 2019 he won his first global senior medal, a silver in the 4 x 100 metre relay at the 2019 World Athletics Championships. He won a second medal, a bronze, in the same event at the 2022 World Athletics Championships.

He was also part of the Great Britain team narrowly pipped to victory by Italy in the final of the 4 x 100 metres relay at the 2020 Summer Olympics. On 18 February 2022 it was announced that Hughes and his teammates CJ Ujah, Nethaneel Mitchell-Blake and Richard Kilty would be stripped of their 4 × 100 metres relay 2020 Summer Olympics silver medals after Court of Arbitration for Sport found Ujah guilty of a doping violation.

As of 2022, he is the joint-second fastest British 100-metre sprinter ever, after Linford Christie and fifth fastest European, and has personal bests of 9.91 seconds for the 100 m and 20.02 seconds for the 200 m.. His time of 20.02 ranks him fifth fastest British 200 metres sprinter in history and 17th fastest European.

Hughes trains with the Racers Track Club in Jamaica under coach Glen Mills, with clubmates including Usain Bolt, Yohan Blake and Delano Williams.

Career

Youth career
Zharnel Hughes was born in The Valley, Anguilla, where his mother worked as a housekeeper and his father as a taxi driver. His family is Jamaican on his mother's side and several of his relatives did sprinting at a low level. Hughes recognised his talent for the sport at the age of ten, when he won several races at a local school sports day where he ran for Orealia Kelly Primary School (formerly Stoney Ground Primary). He made his first international appearance for Anguilla at the 2010 CARIFTA Games at the age of fourteen, placing eighth in the 100 metres final. The following year he improved to sixth at the 2011 CARIFTA Games and made the final at the 2011 Commonwealth Youth Games, having his first runs under 11 seconds that year.

Hughes established himself in regional age category competitions in 2012, setting 100 m and 200 metres championship records at the 2012 Leeward Islands Junior Championships in Athletics, taking 100 m bronze at the 2012 CARIFTA Games, then a 100 m silver and 200 m gold at the 2012 Central American and Caribbean Junior Championships in Athletics. He was selected to represent Anguilla at the 2012 World Junior Championships in Athletics (his global debut) and was a semi-finalist in the short sprints, as well as setting a national record of 20.90 seconds. He ended that year with a personal best of 10.42 seconds for the 100 m.

He was awarded a scholarship in 2012 to attend the IAAF's Regional High Performance Training Centre in Jamaica and began to study at Kingston College. Soon after he had the opportunity to train with world record holder Usain Bolt. Hughes continued to progress in the 2013 season, winning 100 m gold at both the 2013 CARIFTA Games and the 2013 Pan American Junior Athletics Championships. He also made his first appearance in senior international competition at the 2013 Central American and Caribbean Championships in Athletics, reaching the final and recording a personal best of 10.23 seconds in the heats.

At the 2014 Inter-Secondary Schools Boys and Girls Championships he broke Yohan Blake's meet record for the 100 m with a time of 10.12 (Blake had earlier challenged training mate Hughes, saying he could not beat his time). He also recorded a new best of 20.32 seconds in the 200 m semi-finals but withdrew from the final due to an injury. This time ranked him as the number one under-20 athlete in the world that year. He focused on the 200 m the rest of that year, winning the 2014 Central American and Caribbean Junior Championships in Athletics in a championship record of 20.33, but falling short

Senior career
Following his successes in 2014, the question of his eligibility for the 2016 Summer Olympics arose, as Anguilla was not a nation recognised by the International Olympic Committee. As a resident of a British Overseas Territories, Hughes was eligible to compete for Team GB and, following in the footsteps of fellow Anguillian Shara Proctor, he ultimately confirmed in June 2015 that he would represent Great Britain in all World Athletics events. Hughes said "I have always known that if I was to run at the Olympics it would be in a British vest and that is how I have always dreamt it would be." The move received a mixed reaction from British athletes, with Richard Kilty saying that several national team members were unhappy with non-British-born athletes transferring to the team (thus increasing competition for funding). Former British sprinters Darren Campbell and Daniel Caines supported Hughes, noting that Britain was the home nation for people from its colonies.

He began his 2015 season with a new national record of 20.15 seconds for the 200 m in March, placing second to Anaso Jobodwana at the Cayman Invitational. Hughes made his Diamond League debut in June at the adidas Grand Prix in New York, where he was commended for almost beating world champion Usain Bolt. His first British national title win came at the 2015 British Athletics Championships at the start of July, gaining him selection for the 2015 World Championships in Athletics. Wins over 200 m at the London Grand Prix and Athletissima meets moved him to the top of the Diamond League rankings. His new best of 20.05 seconds at the London meet also made him Europe's top ranked sprinter. He improved further 200 metres World Championships final in Beijing, recording a time of 20.02 seconds to place fifth while his clubmate Usain Bolt defended his world title.

Hughes missed the 2016 Olympic Games in Rio due to a tear in his right knee ligament, sustained in a fall earlier in the season. He competed at the 2016 British Athletics Championships against doctor's warnings, but could only manage fourth. He also attempted to persevere at the 2016 European Athletics Championships, but dropped out of the heats and brought his season to a close. His injury rehabilitation in the 2017 season was slow, and he continued to experience pain while running, while affected his performances that year. Competing with the British 4 × 100 metres relay quartet, the team failed to finish at the 2017 IAAF World Relays, but set a championship record of 38.08 seconds to win at the 2017 European Team Championships. Hughes placed fourth in the 200 m at the Adidas Boost Boston Games and 2017 British Athletics Championships. On the 2017 IAAF Diamond League circuit he was fifth at the London Grand Prix then had a season's best of 20.22 seconds for third at the Rabat Meeting. His injuries left him drained in the rounds at the 2017 World Championships in Athletics and he ended up seventh in his semi-final. His performances improved towards the end of the year, with third place in the 100 m at the British Athletics Grand Prix in Birmingham and sixth at the Memorial Van Damme 200 m.

In the 200 m at the 2018 Commonwealth Games, Hughes – competing for England – placed first in the final, but was disqualified for impeding the runner-up, Jereem Richards of Trinidad and Tobago. A gold medal came after in the 4 × 100 metres relay, where he ran the second leg alongside Reuben Arthur, Richard Kilty and Harry Aikines-Aryeetey to win for England.

Hughes proved himself among the world's best 100 m runners in the 2018 season. He improved his best to 10.01 seconds in February, ran a wind-assisted 9.99 to win at the Boston Games (beating Yohan Blake and Tyson Gay), then set a world-leading time of 9.91 seconds in June, becoming the 129th person to break the 10-second barrier. This raised him to second on the all-time British rankings behind Linford Christie, and equal with James Dasaolu.

In 2021, Hughes reached the 100m final at the 2020 Summer Olympics, but was disqualified for a false start. Hughes won the silver medal for the
men's 4x100 relay, but the team was stripped of the medal because teammate CJ Ujah was found guilty of doping. 

In 2022, Hughes won Gold in the Mens 200m at the European Championships in Munich followed by a silver medal in the Mens 100m final.

Bests

Personal bests

Seasons bests

Times given in seconds and senior world rank in parentheses

International competitions

See also
 List of 200 metres national champions (men)
 List of eligibility transfers in athletics
 List of Commonwealth Games medallists in athletics (men)

References

External links
 
 
 
 
 
 

1995 births
Living people
People from The Valley, Anguilla
British male sprinters
Anguillan male sprinters
Olympic athletes of Great Britain
Anguillan people of Jamaican descent
Olympic silver medallists for Great Britain
Olympic silver medalists in athletics (track and field)
Olympic male sprinters
Athletes (track and field) at the 2020 Summer Olympics
Medalists at the 2020 Summer Olympics
Commonwealth Games competitors for England
Commonwealth Games gold medallists for England
Commonwealth Games gold medallists in athletics
Athletes (track and field) at the 2018 Commonwealth Games
World Athletics Championships athletes for Great Britain
World Athletics Championships medalists
European Athletics Championships winners
British Athletics Championships winners
Black British sportspeople
Competitors stripped of Summer Olympics medals
Medallists at the 2018 Commonwealth Games